The Diocese of Davenport is a Latin Church ecclesiastical jurisdiction, or diocese, of the Catholic Church for the southeastern quarter of the state of Iowa in the United States.

The current bishop of Davenport is Thomas Zinkula. The diocese is a suffragan see of the Archdiocese of Dubuque. The see city for the diocese is Davenport. Sacred Heart Cathedral is the cathedral church.

Territory 

 The eastern border is the Mississippi River. 
 The northern border comprises Jasper, Poweshiek, Iowa, Johnson, Cedar, and Clinton counties.
 The western border comprises Jasper, Marion, Monroe, and Appanoose counties.
 The southern border is the Missouri state line.

History

1830 to 1884 
The first Catholic missionaries arrived in the Iowa area during the early 1830's. They were under the supervision of the Diocese of St. Louis. In 1837, the Vatican erected the Diocese of Dubuque, covering Iowa and adjoining territories. 

Bishop John Hennessy of the Diocese of Dubuque  requested that the Vatican divide the state into two dioceses, with the new diocese covering the lower half of Iowa. Hennessy suggested that the see of the new diocese be located in Des Moines, Iowa, but the Vatican chose Davenport instead.

On June 14, 1881, Pope Leo XXIII erected the Diocese of Davenport. He selected Reverend John McMullen of the Archdiocese of Chicago to serve as the first bishop of Davenport. 

As bishop, McMullen chose St. Margaret's Church in Davenport to be the new cathedral. Soon after arriving in Davenport, McMullen went to visit the parishes in his diocese. He traveled by stagecoach, buggy, lumber wagon, hand car and passenger coach on the train. While on visitation he administered the sacrament of Confirmation.  By December 1881, McMullen had confirmed over 7,000 people, and by December 1882, over 13,000. McMullen called the diocese's first synod in 1882 to set its procedures and regulations. In September 1882, he founded St. Ambrose, a seminary and school of commerce in Davenport. After only three years as bishop, McMullen died in 1883.

1884 to 1900 
Reverend Henry Cosgrove of the Diocese of Dubuque was appointed the second bishop of Davenport on July 11, 1884, by Leo XIII.  Deciding that St. Margaret's was no longer adequate as a cathedral, Cosgrove constructed Sacred Heart Cathedral in 1891 to replace it. Cosgrove established St. Vincent's Home for orphans in 1895 in Davenport by the Congregation of the Humility of Mary in 1896.Cosgrove supported the national Temperance Movement and called for a moral crusade in the diocese, especially in Davenport.  In 1903 he was quoted in the national media calling Davenport "the wicked city of its size in America" because of its notorious Bucktown District, an area of speakeasies and brothels that was close to St. Margaret's.

1900 to 1930 
On October 7, 1904, at Cosgrove's request, Pope Pius X named Reverend James J. Davis as coadjutor bishop of the diocese. Cosgrove presided over the diocese's second synod the same year.  When Cosgrove died in 1906, Davis automatically became bishop of Davenport.

On August 12, 1911, Pius X erected the new Diocese of Des Moines from the western half of the Diocese of Davenport. Davis was named administrator of the new diocese until a bishop was named. Before the Diocese of Des Moines was established, Davis had requested that all the diocesan boundaries in Iowa be redrawn to distribute the Catholic population more evenly. If the Diocese of Davenport Diocese were simply divided in half, it would be reduced to 35,000 Catholics and the new Diocese of Des Moines would have only 25,000. In contrast, the Archdiocese of Dubuque had 109,000 Catholics and the Diocese of Sioux City had 50,000 Catholics. While the Vatican denied Davis' request for new boundaries, it did sever Clinton County from the archdiocese and give it to the Diocese of Davenport. The diocese at this time had 50,000 Catholics in a total population of 589,000. 

After Davis died in 1926, Pope Pius XI named Reverend Henry Rohlman of the Diocese of Dubuque as the fourth bishop of the Diocese of Davenport. In 1928, Rohlman commissioned a study to assess the social problems in the diocese. The result of this study was the establishment of Catholic Charities in 1929. Its immediate focus was the welfare of the children at St. Vincent's Home in Davenport.

1930 to 1966 
The diocese celebrated its Golden Jubilee in 1931. The next year, Rohlman convoked the diocese's third synod. The synod was called to bring the diocese's regulations in line with the Code of Canon Law which had been promulgated in 1917. It also set the salary for pastors at $1,000 per year, plus household expenses, and associate pastors and chaplain's salaries were set at $500. Catholic Charities had set up their offices in the Kahl Building. They were joined in 1932 with the chancery and the newly established superintendent of schools. All of these offices and the bishop's office moved into a property on Church Square behind St. Anthony's Church downtown. It was renamed the Cosgrove Building after Bishop Cosgrove.The Catholic Messenger, an independent Catholic newspaper published in Davenport, was experiencing financial problems during the Great Depression and was purchased by the diocese for use as a diocesan newspaper in 1937.

Pope Pius XII named Reverend Henry Rohlman as archbishop of the Archdiocese of Dubuque in 1944 and replaced him in Davenport with Bishop Ralph Leo Hayes of the Diocese of Helena. Enrollment in the Catholic Schools reached their highest enrollments during Hayes’ episcopate. Elementary school enrollment reached its highest mark in 1960 at 12,074. The high schools reached their highest mark in 1965 with 4,129 students. A four-day conference sponsored by the National Catholic Welfare Council was held in Davenport in 1949. It focused on the themes of industry, education and rural life.  Hayes established the Papal Volunteers of Latin America in the diocese in February 1961 in response to a plea from Pope John XXIII. Missionaries from the diocese were sent to Cuernavaca, Mexico and Ponce, Puerto Rico.

1966 to 1993 

Hayes retired in 1966 after 22 years as bishop of Davenport. To replace him, Pope Paul VI named Auxiliary Bishop Gerald O'Keefe of the Diocese of St. Paul. O'Keefe established a Sister's Council for the members of women's religious orders in 1967 and a Lay Council in 1970.  He created the first Diocesan Pastoral Council.. A Diocesan Board of Education was also established early in his episcopate. Procedures for due process were put in place in the late 1960,s. In 1978, O'Keefe established the permanent diaconate in the diocese. The first class of deacons was ordained on December 13, 1980. A Deacons Council was also organized.

O’Keefe joined with Bishops Arthur O'Neil of Rockford and John Franz of Peoria to create an office that assisted migrant workers with job and education services. In 1972 the Social Action department established an Immigration Office. Priests were also sent to Mexico to learn Spanish and to be immersed in the culture. Three Spanish-speaking deacons were ordained in 1981.

The economic recession of the 1980's effected the diocesan population and resources. In 1991, O'Keefe announced a plan for clustering and closing smaller parishes, which reflected both the decline in the number of priests and the diocese population. The diocese also witnessed a decline in enrollment in Catholic Schools, which led to the merger or closing of schools across Southeast Iowa. Catholic hospitals were also affected. In 1970 there were ten hospitals in the diocese;by the time O'Keefe retired in 1993, they were reduced to three.

1993 to 2010 
To replace O'Keefe, Pope John Paul II named Auxiliary Bishop William Franklin of the Archdiocese of Dubuque as the next bishop of Davenport in 1993.  Franklin revised the diocesan staff, creating an Office of Pastoral Services that combined the ministries of liturgy, education, and social action into the same office. He initially did away with the Diocesan Pastoral Council and instituted a Diocesan Pastoral Council Convocation in its place.

Several parishes in the diocese either merged or closed because of changing demographics. The Redemptorists, who had served St. Alphonsus parish in Davenport for 89 years as well as in other parishes, left the diocese in 1997 because of declining numbers. The Sisters of St. Francis in Clinton built a new motherhouse in Clinton, Iowa called the Canticle, also in 1997. Franklin retired in 2006.

In 2006, Pope Benedict XVI appointed Auxiliary Bishop[ Martin Amos of the Diocese of Cleveland as the eighth bishop of the Diocese of Davenport, Two days before Amos assumed office, the diocese filed for Chapter 11 Bankruptcy protection. As a result of the bankruptcy, the diocese was forced to sell off property, including the bishop's residence, to pay for a financial settlement to sexual abuse victims. Amos had previously requested a small fixer-upper house to live in, believing the bishop's residence too big for him. The diocese sold the chancery building, the St. Vincent Center, and the surrounding property to St. Ambrose University in May 2009. In March 2010, the diocese bought back the St. Vincent Center and five acres of land. A $22 million capital campaign was also initiated in 2009 to replenish diocesan finances and to provide the finances for other projects.

2010 to present 
On July 1, 2010, the diocese re-established Catholic Charities. The organization was initially introduced into the diocese in 1929 by Bishop Henry Rohlman, but discontinued in 1968.

In May 2012, Amos rescinded an invitation to a representative of the Rich Eychaner Charitable Foundation to present a scholarship to Keaton Fuller, a student at the Prince of Peace Catholic School in Clinton, Iowa. The Eychander Foundation promotes anti-bullying legislation and seeks to promote tolerance and non-discrimination for LBGT youth.  Amos and the foundation reached a compromise in which a foundation representative would award the statue to Fuller and a diocesan representative would deliver a pre-approved statement from the foundation. Amos retired in 2017.

The current bishop of the Diocese of Davenport is Thomas Zinkula from the Archdiocese of Dubuque.  He was appointed by Pope Francis in 2017.

Sex abuse cases
In 1992, Bishop O’Keefe was sued by two women who claimed that he had sexually abused them as young girls when he was rector of St. Paul Cathedral in St. Paul, Minnesota, in the early 1960's. Both women credited recovering repressed memories for their accusations. O'Keefe denied the charges. A year later, he was cleared of any wrongdoing after an investigation determined the women suffered from mental illnesses and had made up the accusations while in therapy.

In 2002, Bishop Franklin received allegations of sexual abuse of minors in the 1970's by William Wiebler, a diocese priest.  After Wiebler confessed his crimes to Franklin, the bishop ordered him to enter the Vianney Renewal Center, a treatment facility for priests in Dittmer, Missouri.  However, Wiebler later checked out of the facility and moved into a private residence in University City, Missouri.  In 2004, the diocese settled the claims of 37 sexual abuse victims for $9 million dollars; one of the priests named in the settlement was Wiebler.  He was laicized in January 2006, several months before his death.

On October 10, 2006, the diocese filed for Chapter 11 protection. By November 27, 2007, $37 million had been allocated in legal settlements to 156 victims. In 2014, documents revealed that former diocesan priest James Janssen, who sexually abused boys  and was laicized in 2004, stated in court during lawsuits that "I'm very sick." Janssen died in 2015.  In 2007, Bishop Amos announced that the board of trustees of St. Ambrose University had decided to remove O'Keefe's name from the school library. O'Keefe had covered up sexual abuse crimes by priests in the diocese. 

On June 3, 2019, Bishop Zinkula indicated that the diocese would comply with a request from the Iowa Attorney General for sexual abuses records on clerics in the diocese.

On March 20, 2020, the diocese announced that Reverend Robert Grant, a theology professor at St. Ambrose University, had been suspended from teaching and practicing ministry after a sex abuse allegation surfaced. The alleged sex abuse was committed during his time in the Diocese of Des Moines in the early 1990's. The diocese also said that Grant had been removed as the sacramental minister at the St. Andrew Church in Blue Grass, Iowa. Both suspensions were to continue until the Diocese of Des Moines completed its investigation of Grant.

Higher education

St. Ambrose 

Saint Ambrose University is the only institution of higher education that is still operational in the diocese.  It began as a seminary and commerce school for young men. It was founded in September 1882 by Bishop McMullen in the school building of St. Margaret's Cathedral. St. Ambrose moved to its current location in 1885. Its name was changed to St. Ambrose College in 1908, then in 1987 to St. Ambrose University.

Visitation Academy/Ottumwa Heights College 
The Congregation of the Humility of Mary founded Visitation Academy in 1864 at their mother house in Ottumwa, Iowa. The academy had several name changes until 1930, when it was named Ottumwa Heights College. Ottumwa Heights merged with Indian Hills Community College (IHCC) in 1979 and has been officially inactive since 1980. The community's former motherhouse and college property has been IHCC's main campus since 1981.

Marycrest College/Marycrest International University 
The Congregation also founded Marycrest College in Davenport in 1939 as the woman's division of St. Ambrose. By the 1950's it had become a separate institution, and started admitting men in 1969. In 1990, Marycrest became affiliated with the Teikyo Yamanashi Education and Welfare Foundation of Japan and was renamed Teikyo Marycrest University. In 1996, it was renamed as Marycrest International University. However, declining enrollment and financial difficulties forced Marycrest to close in 2002.  The campus in 2006 it became Marycrest Senior Campus, a residential facility for senior citizens.  It has no affiliation with the diocese.

Mount St. Claire College/Franciscan University 

The Sisters of St. Francis of Assisi established Mount St. Claire College for women in 1918 in Clinton,Iowa. The college began offering graduate courses over the internet in 2002 and changed its name to The Franciscan University. In 2004, the school modified its name to The Franciscan University of the Prairies, so as to avoid confusion with similarly named institutions. In 2005, the school was purchased by Bridgepoint Education, Inc. and the sisters ended their sponsorship. The school became known as Ashford University and closed in 2016.

Since 1947 the diocese has supported a dedicated campus ministry program at the Newman Catholic Student Center at the University of Iowa in Iowa City.

Coat of arms
The coat of arms for the Diocese of Davenport was designed after the arms used by members of the Davenport family in England. The family's arms are described as, "Argent (white or silver), a chevron sable (black) between three cross crosslets fitchée of the second."  The diocesan shield maintains the use of the silver color and the black cross crosslets fitchée. The black chevron is replaced with a black crenellated tower.

Bishops

Historic structures
The following structures are listed on the National Register of Historic Places (NRHP). Some of the structures are no longer part of the diocese but have historical significance to the parish.

High schools

Former high schools

See also
Pacem in Terris Award

References

External links

 
 The Catholic Messenger

 
Davenport
Religious organizations established in 1881
Davenport
1881 establishments in Iowa
Companies that filed for Chapter 11 bankruptcy in 2006